The 1970 Pacific typhoon season has no official bounds; it ran year-round in 1970, but most tropical cyclones tend to form in the northwestern Pacific Ocean between June and December. These dates conventionally delimit the period of each year when most tropical cyclones form in the northwestern Pacific Ocean.

The scope of this article is limited to the Pacific Ocean, north of the equator and west of the International Dateline. Storms that form east of the date line and north of the equator are called hurricanes; see 1970 Pacific hurricane season. Tropical Storms formed in the entire west Pacific basin were assigned a name by the Joint Typhoon Warning Center. Tropical depressions in this basin have the "W" suffix added to their number. Tropical depressions that enter or form in the Philippine area of responsibility are assigned a name by the Philippine Atmospheric, Geophysical and Astronomical Services Administration or PAGASA. This can often result in the same storm having two names.

Systems 

27 tropical depressions formed this year in the Western Pacific, of which 24 became tropical storms. 12 storms reached typhoon intensity, of which 7 reached super typhoon strength.

Typhoon Nancy (Atang) 

Nancy originated from the interaction between an active ITCZ and a cold front near the Caroline Islands and the equator in mid February. An increase in convection was shown by weather satellites on February 18 and by the following day a recon aircraft found a weak depression to the south of the Caroline Islands. The depression moved west, suppressed south by a high pressure ridge to the north, and gradually strengthened into a tropical storm and was given the name Nancy early on February 20. Nancy became a typhoon on the 22 about 100 miles northwest from Woleai. On February 23 Nancy passed to the north of Yap where strong gale winds occurred. This was the equivalent of a category four hurricane. It is rare to have a typhoon of this magnitude during the month of February, as noted by the JTWC, only Irma of the 1953 season reached the same intensity at the time. As Nancy approached the Philippine Islands the typhoon traversed to the western ambit of the ridge that had kept it to the south, allowing it to move farther in a north direction. During the 25 Nancy passed east off the coast of the easternmost islands of the Philippines. On the island of Catanduanes, the edge of the eye brushed the eastern coast. A U. S. Coast Guard loran station on Catanduanes recorded intense winds, at which point the equipment malfunctioned. The storm encountered a hostile environment to the northeast of Luzon and began to weaken. By February 26 Nancy had become a tropical storm and shortly afterward had transitioned into an extra tropical cyclone and moved off into open ocean. By the 28 what remained of Nancy was a frontal trough.
  
Nancy caused significant damage to the Philippines and surrounding islands. Particularly hard hit were the islands of Catanduanes and Samar. Damage was estimated near a million dollars with 5,000 families homeless. On the Island of Yap heavy storm surge caused $160,000 in damages, luckily no one was killed. A 6,065 ton American ship, Antinous, encountered the full brunt of the typhoon shortly before midnight, February 24. Ship logs record sea swells of over 40 feet, winds over 100 knots, a central pressure of 953 millibars, and three of the ships large butane tanks on the main dock broke free during the storm along with a portion of its bulwark.

Typhoon Olga (Deling) 

In mid-June a change in the jet stream over a large part of the Pacific Ocean caused an increase in tropical wave frequency; one becoming the precursor to Olga. The wave was first noticed near the Marshall Islands, particularly the Island of Majuro on June 24. As it moved west weather satellites depicted the wave had begun to organize with considerable convection and spiraling storm bands as it neared the Central Caroline Islands. Due to the waves close proximity to a high pressure area to the north, strong easterlies accelerated it to the west. The increased forward speed inhibited the establishment of a circulation until it was south of Guam early on June 29. Later that day reconnaissance found a closed center and gale-force winds, prompting the JTWC to upgrade the low into a tropical storm and was given the name Olga. As it entered the Philippine Sea the ridge that had kept it to the south began to weaken allowing Olga to move in a northwestward direction. As Olga entered an increasingly favorable environment, the storm slowed its forward speed and strengthened into a typhoon late on June 29. The rapid 62 millibar drop between June 30 and July 1 caused an intense wind profile surrounding the small eye. The storm followed a break in the ridge and moved north while gradually weakening. As Olga was passing to the east of Taiwan a short wave from the China mainland gave an eastward component to the storm's motion. A low developed following the short wave and began to influence Olga, causing the typhoon to weaken. Dry air soon entered the circulation, reducing the systems overall convection. During July 5 Olga made landfall on the Kansai region of Japan, south of Osaka, as a tropical storm. The system continued into the Sea of Japan, and merged with a cold front. The remaining low tracked over South Korea before completely dissipating on July 7.

Olga was a very intense typhoon, causing an estimated ten million dollars to Japan alone. While passing through the Ryukyu Islands wind measurements were as high as 130 mph (205 km/h) on July 4. Heavy rains occurred over Japan, up to 14 inches in some areas, caused landslides and extensive flooding; killing 20. In South Korea 29 deaths were caused by the heavy rainfall associated with Olga's remnants.

Severe Tropical Storm Pamela (Klaring) 

Forming on June 28, Pamela slowly travelled towards the Philippines, and made landfall late on June 30. The tropical storm brought rains and winds to the Philippines, but no major damage was reported. Having greatly weakened after landfall, Pamela degenerated into a remnant low and dissipated over the South China Sea on July 1, just as Category 5 Super Typhoon Olga reached its peak.

Severe Tropical Storm Ruby (Emang) 

Tropical Storm Ruby formed as a disturbance east of the Philippines. It slowly traveled west-southwest, becoming a tropical storm on the 12th. It crossed the northern part of Luzon before making landfall in China on the 15th. The storm became extratropical over China, and proceeded northwest, crossing Hokkaido before dissipating over the Aleutian Islands.

Tropical Storm Sally 

Tropical Storm Sally stayed far offshore during its life. It formed as a disturbance over the Pacific on the 18th, became a tropical storm on the 21st, then became extratropical on the 22nd and dissipated the next day.

Tropical Depression 07W (Gading)

Tropical Storm 06W

Tropical Storm Therese 

Tropical Storm Therese also remained far at sea during its life. It formed as a disturbance on the 30th, then turned northwestward and became a tropical storm, before undergoing extratropical transition and dissipating over the Bering Sea.

Tropical Storm Violet (Heling) 

Tropical Storm Violet formed east of the Philippines, then traveled westward, becoming a tropical storm before making landfall on Luzon. Violet then crossed the South China Sea before making landfall in China as a weak tropical storm. It dissipated over China shortly after.

Typhoon Wilda (Iliang) 

A broad surface trough developed into Tropical Storm Wilda on August 9. After drifting to the west-southwest, it turned to the north, where it reached a peak of 120 mph winds on the 12th near Okinawa. Wilda continued northward, and weakened slightly to a 105 mph typhoon before making landfall on western Kyūshū on the 14th. Wilda accelerated to the northeast, and became extratropical on the 15th. The typhoon caused heavy rain, killing 11 people.

Typhoon Anita 

An upper level low contributed to the formation of Tropical Depression 11W on August 16 over the northern Marianas Islands. It quickly intensified, reaching typhoon status that night. Anita's intensification rate slowed initially, but as it continued northwestward late on the 18th and 19th, Anita rapidly strengthened to a 155 mph super typhoon. It weakened as it accelerated to the north-northwest, and hit western Shikoku in Japan on the 21st as a 115 mph typhoon. Anita, which became extratropical on the 22nd, caused 23 deaths and sank 31 vessels.

Typhoon Billie (Loleng) 

Typhoon Billie formed in the Philippine Sea as a weak depression. It intensified while heading northwards, becoming a tropical storm on the 23rd, a typhoon on the 25th, and reaching its maximum intensity of 110-knot winds and a 945-millibar central pressure as it passed the Ryukyu Islands on the 27th. The storm brushed South Korea as a category-1-equivalent typhoon on the 29th before making landfall in North Korea on the 30th. The remnants of Billie dissipated over the Sino-Soviet border shortly after.

Typhoon Clara 

Tropical Storm Clara developed on August 26 southeast of Japan from an upper tropospheric circulation that separated from the Mid-Pacific trough. It quickly strengthened, and became a typhoon on the 27th at 31.9º North, one of only 16 Western Pacific typhoons to reach that strength north of 30ºN. Clara peaked at 95 mph before coming close to Japan, when a shortwave trough forced it sharply eastward. The storm maintained its intensity until becoming extratropical on September 3. An interesting fact about Clara was a reconnaissance mission flown into Hurricane Dot in the central Pacific also flew into Clara on the same flight, an unusual accomplishment not normally seen.

Tropical Depression Miding

Severe Tropical Storm Fran (Norming) 

Tropical Storm Fran formed east of the Philippines on the 3rd, then traveled in a rather unusual fashion, traveling away from the coast before turning back towards it. It passed over the northern part of Taiwan Island on the 6th, before making landfall in China on the 7th. The remnants of Fran lingered over China for some days before it dissipated.

Tropical Storm Ellen (Oyang) 

Tropical Storm Ellen formed east of the Philippines and traveled northwestwards, becoming a tropical storm well south of Japan. It passed over the southern Ryukyu Islands before dissipating.

Typhoon Georgia (Pitang) 

Georgia originated from a tropical wave on September 7, and became tropical storm Georgia on the 8th. Moving over warmer waters, Georgia reached typhoon status late on the 8th and super typhoon status on the 10th, developing a distinct eye. Georgia continued to strengthen further and peaked as a 160 mph category 5 super typhoon, just as the typhoon made landfall at Luzon. Georgia did not drop a lot of rain during its passage through the Philippines, but its strong winds caused 95 casualties (with 80 missing) and damage at $1.4 million (1970 USD). Georgia greatly weakened over the Philippines, and emerged into the South China Sea on the 12th, as a category 1 typhoon. A trough turned Georgia to the north on the 13th, and Georgia made its final landfall in China, degenerating into a remnant low on the 14th, and completely dissipating on the 16th.

Typhoon Hope 
The strongest storm of the season, Hope was a very strong category 5 super typhoon with pressure reaching 895 mbar. Hope did not affect land and stayed well out to sea. It formed in September 19 and dissipated on September 30.

Tropical Depression Ruping

Typhoon Iris 

Iris was the first typhoon to develop over the South China Sea in October since 1957. Iris developed on the 2nd due to a shear line. It intensified while slowly traveling northwards, reaching its maximum intensity on the afternoon of the 6th while 140 miles south of Hong Kong. The conditions around the system rapidly became unfavorable after that, and it weakened quickly, finally dissipating on the 9th.

Tropical Depression 20W

Typhoon Joan (Sening) 

A tropical disturbance organized into Tropical Storm Joan on October 10, east of the Philippines. Conditions favored strengthening, and Joan reached typhoon status on the 11th. From late on the 11th to early on the 13th, Typhoon Joan rapidly intensified to a 175 mph Super Typhoon. It struck the southeastern Luzon at that intensity on the 13th, and crossed the archipelago. After weakening to a minimal typhoon, Joan turned to the northwest, where it reintensified to a 115 mph typhoon. It made landfall on eastern Hainan Island on the 16th, and dissipated on the 18th over China. Joan left 768 people dead (with 193 missing), and caused $74 million in damage (1970 USD), mostly from agricultural losses.

Typhoon Kate (Titang) 

Tropical Storm Kate developed just behind Typhoon Joan, east of the southern Philippines on October 14. It tracked westward as a small cyclone, and strengthened into a typhoon on the 15th. It made landfall twice, once in the Philippines and once in Vietnam, resulting in at least 631 fatalities (with 284 missing) and $50 million in damage.

Typhoon Louise (Uding) 

Typhoon Louise (classified as a tropical storm by the JTWC) formed as a disturbance east of the Philippines. The disturbance traveled across them before it became a tropical storm over the South China Sea. It made landfall in South Vietnam and dissipated over the Gulf of Thailand.

Severe Tropical Storm Marge (Wening) 

Tropical Storm Marge followed a similar path to Louise. It formed over the Pacific, becoming a tropical depression south of Guam. It became a tropical storm 3 days later, then crossed southern Luzon before dissipating over the South China Sea off the Vietnamese coast.

Tropical Storm Nora 

Tropical Storm Nora formed south of Vietnam and began to strengthen, becoming a tropical storm the next day. The system passed south of Cape Cà Mau as a tropical storm before weakening and dissipating over the Gulf of Thailand. The remnants of Nora then crossed the Malay Peninsula on the 5th, and contributed to the formation of the 1970 Bhola cyclone on the 8th, which devastated East Pakistan (Modern day Bangladesh).

Severe Tropical Storm Opal 

Tropical Storm Opal formed as a disturbance over the sea east of Mindanao, then crossed the Philippines before becoming a depression over the South China Sea. It intensified into a tropical storm as it turned southwestward over the South China Sea, passing close to Vietnam, but it dissipated southeast of the Mekong Delta.

Typhoon Patsy (Yoling) 

A tropical disturbance organized into Tropical Depression 27W on November 14 near the Marianas Islands. A strong ridge to its north forced it westward, where it strengthened to tropical storm status later on the 14th. Patsy steadily intensified, reaching typhoon strength on the 16th and peaking at 155 mph on the 18th. Its inflow became disrupted by the Philippines to its west, and Patsy hit Luzon on the 19th with winds of 130 mph, making it the 3rd strong typhoon since September to strike the island. After crossing the island, Patsy traversed the South China Sea, where cooler waters kept the system a tropical storm. On November 22, Patsy struck Vietnam, and dissipated soon after. Typhoon Patsy was one of the deadliest typhoons to strike the Philippines in its history. 611 people were killed (with 351 missing) on the island, and 135 people were killed at sea due to shipping failures. Because the Vietnam War was raging at that time, it is difficult to say about the damage or death toll, but estimates say that 30 people died in Vietnam.

Tropical Storm Ruth (Aning) 

Tropical Storm Ruth formed as a disturbance far at sea, then slowly travelled westward, but it did not intensify into a tropical depression until it was in the South China Sea. It briefly became a tropical storm south of the Mekong Delta, but it weakened into a tropical depression before it crossed just south of Cape Cà Mau. The remnants of Ruth dissipated just off the coast of Thailand.

Tropical Depression Bidang

Other systems 
According to the Japan Meteorological Agency, on September 2 Tropical Cyclone Dot briefly crossed the International Date Line from the Central Pacific into its area of responsibility, crossing back later that day.

Storm names 
Western North Pacific tropical cyclones were named by the Joint Typhoon Warning Center. The first storm of 1970 was named Nancy and the final one was named Ruth.

One Central Pacific System developed, Hurricane Dot. The policy at that time was to use Western Pacific Names for the Central Pacific.

Philippines 

The Philippine Atmospheric, Geophysical and Astronomical Services Administration uses its own naming scheme for tropical cyclones in their area of responsibility. PAGASA assigns names to tropical depressions that form within their area of responsibility and any tropical cyclone that might move into their area of responsibility. Should the list of names for a given year prove to be insufficient, names are taken from an auxiliary list, the first 6 of which are published each year before the season starts. Names not retired from this list will be used again in the 1974 season. This is the same list used for the 1966 season. PAGASA uses its own naming scheme that starts in the Filipino alphabet, with names of Filipino female names ending with "ng" (A, B, K, D, etc.).

Retirement 
Due to the severe damage in the Philippines, PAGASA later retired the names Pitang, Sening, Titang, and Yoling. Those were replaced by Pasing, Susang, Tering, and Yaning for the 1974 season. This season had the most retired names by PAGASA at that time.

Season effects 
This table will list all the storms that developed in the northwestern Pacific Ocean west of the International Date Line and north of the equator during 1970. It will include their intensity, duration, name, areas affected, deaths, missing persons (in parentheses), and damage totals. Classification and intensity values will be based on estimations conducted by the JMA, however due to lack of information around this time sustained winds were recorded by the JTWC. All damage figures will be in 1970 USD. Damages and deaths from a storm will include when the storm was a precursor wave or an extratropical low.

|-
| TD ||  || bgcolor=#| || bgcolor=#| || bgcolor=#| || None ||  None || None ||
|-
| TD ||  || bgcolor=#| || bgcolor=#| || bgcolor=#| || None ||  None || None ||
|-
| Nancy ||  || bgcolor=#| || bgcolor=#| || bgcolor=#| || Caroline Islands, Philippines ||  || None ||
|-
| TD ||  || bgcolor=#| || bgcolor=#| || bgcolor=#| || Palau, Philippines ||  None || None ||
|-
| Bising ||  || bgcolor=#| || bgcolor=#| || bgcolor=#| || Taiwan ||  None || None ||
|-
| TD ||  || bgcolor=#| || bgcolor=#| || bgcolor=#| || Philippines ||  None || None ||
|-
| Olga (Deling) ||  || bgcolor=#| || bgcolor=#| || bgcolor=#| || Caroline Islands, Ryukyu Islands, Japan, South Korea ||  ||  ||
|-
| Pamela (Klaring) ||  || bgcolor=#| || bgcolor=#| || bgcolor=#| || Philippines ||  Unknown || Unknown ||
|-
| TD ||  || bgcolor=#| || bgcolor=#| || bgcolor=#| || None ||  None || None ||
|-
| TD ||  || bgcolor=#| || bgcolor=#| || bgcolor=#| || None ||  None || None ||
|-
| Ruby (Emang) ||  || bgcolor=#| || bgcolor=#| || bgcolor=#| || Philippines, South China ||  None || None ||
|-
| TD ||  || bgcolor=#| || bgcolor=#| || bgcolor=#| || None ||  None || None ||
|-
| TD ||  || bgcolor=#| || bgcolor=#| || bgcolor=#| || None ||  None || None ||
|-
| Sally ||  || bgcolor=#| || bgcolor=#| || bgcolor=#| || None ||  None || None ||
|-
| TD ||  || bgcolor=#| || bgcolor=#| || bgcolor=#| || None ||  None || None ||
|-
| 07W (Gading) ||  || bgcolor=#| || bgcolor=#| || bgcolor=#| || Taiwan, East China ||  None || None ||
|-
| 06W ||  || bgcolor=#| || bgcolor=#| || bgcolor=#| || Ryukyu Islands ||  None || None ||
|-
| TD ||  || bgcolor=#| || bgcolor=#| || bgcolor=#| || Ryukyu Islands ||  None || None ||
|-
| Therese ||  || bgcolor=#| || bgcolor=#| || bgcolor=#| || None ||  None || None ||
|-
| TD ||  || bgcolor=#| || bgcolor=#| || bgcolor=#| || None ||  None || None ||
|-
| TD ||  || bgcolor=#| || bgcolor=#| || bgcolor=#| || None ||  None || None ||
|-
| Violet (Heling) ||  || bgcolor=#| || bgcolor=#| || bgcolor=#| || Philippines, South China ||  None || None ||
|-
| TD ||  || bgcolor=#| || bgcolor=#| || bgcolor=#| || None ||  None || None ||
|-
| Wilda (Iliang) ||  || bgcolor=#| || bgcolor=#| || bgcolor=#| || Ryukyu Islands, Japan ||  Unknown ||  ||
|-
| TD ||  || bgcolor=#| || bgcolor=#| || bgcolor=#| || Philippines ||  None || None ||
|-
| TD ||  || bgcolor=#| || bgcolor=#| || bgcolor=#| || Vietnam ||  None || None ||
|-
| TD ||  || bgcolor=#| || bgcolor=#| || bgcolor=#| || Mariana Islands ||  None || None ||
|-
| TD ||  || bgcolor=#| || bgcolor=#| || bgcolor=#| || Vietnam ||  None || None ||
|-
| TD ||  || bgcolor=#| || bgcolor=#| || bgcolor=#| || Ryukyu Islands ||  None || None ||
|-
| Anita ||  || bgcolor=#| || bgcolor=#| || bgcolor=#| || Japan ||  None ||  ||
|-
| TD ||  || bgcolor=#| || bgcolor=#| || bgcolor=#| || Japan ||  None || None ||
|-
| TD ||  || bgcolor=#| || bgcolor=#| || bgcolor=#| || None ||  None || None ||
|-
| Billie (Loleng) ||  || bgcolor=#| || bgcolor=#| || bgcolor=#| || Ryukyu Islands, Korean Peninsula ||  Unknown || Unknown ||
|-
| TD ||  || bgcolor=#| || bgcolor=#| || bgcolor=#| || None ||  None || None ||
|-
| Clara ||  || bgcolor=#| || bgcolor=#| || bgcolor=#| || None ||  None || None ||
|-
| TD ||  || bgcolor=#| || bgcolor=#| || bgcolor=#| || None ||  None || None ||
|-
| TD ||  || bgcolor=#| || bgcolor=#| || bgcolor=#| || None ||  None || None ||
|-
| Miding ||  || bgcolor=#| || bgcolor=#| || bgcolor=#| || Taiwan ||  None || None ||
|-
| Dot ||  || bgcolor=#| || bgcolor=#| || bgcolor=#| || None ||  None || None ||
|-
| Fran (Norming)||  || bgcolor=#| || bgcolor=#| || bgcolor=#| || Ryukyu Islands, Taiwan, East China ||  None || None ||
|-
| TD ||  || bgcolor=#| || bgcolor=#| || bgcolor=#| || Laos ||  None || None ||
|-
| Ellen (Oyang) ||  || bgcolor=#| || bgcolor=#| || bgcolor=#| || Ryukyu Islands ||  None || None ||
|-
| TD ||  || bgcolor=#| || bgcolor=#| || bgcolor=#| || None ||  None || None ||
|-
| Georgia (Pitang) ||  || bgcolor=#| || bgcolor=#| || bgcolor=#| || Philippines, China ||  ||  ||
|-
| TD ||  || bgcolor=#| || bgcolor=#| || bgcolor=#| || None ||  None || None ||
|-
| TD ||  || bgcolor=#| || bgcolor=#| || bgcolor=#| || None ||  None || None ||
|-
| TD ||  || bgcolor=#| || bgcolor=#| || bgcolor=#| || None ||  None || None ||
|-
| Ruping ||  || bgcolor=#| || bgcolor=#| || bgcolor=#| || Philippines ||  None || None ||
|-
| Hope ||  || bgcolor=#| || bgcolor=#| || bgcolor=#| || None ||  None || None ||
|-
| TD ||  || bgcolor=#| || bgcolor=#| || bgcolor=#| || None ||  None || None ||
|-
| TD ||  || bgcolor=#| || bgcolor=#| || bgcolor=#| || None ||  None || None ||
|-
| Iris ||  || bgcolor=#| || bgcolor=#| || bgcolor=#| || South China ||  None || None ||
|-
| TD ||  || bgcolor=#| || bgcolor=#| || bgcolor=#| || None ||  None || None ||
|-
| 20W ||  || bgcolor=#| || bgcolor=#| || bgcolor=#| || None ||  None || None ||
|-
| TD ||  || bgcolor=#| || bgcolor=#| || bgcolor=#| || None ||  None || None ||
|-
| Joan (Sening) ||  || bgcolor=#| || bgcolor=#| || bgcolor=#| || Caroline Islands, Philippines, South China ||  ||  ||
|-
| TD ||  || bgcolor=#| || bgcolor=#| || bgcolor=#| || Vietnam ||  None || None ||
|-
| TD ||  || bgcolor=#| || bgcolor=#| || bgcolor=#| || None ||  None || None ||
|-
| Kate (Titang) ||  || bgcolor=#| || bgcolor=#| || bgcolor=#| || Philippines ||  ||  ||
|-
| TD ||  || bgcolor=#| || bgcolor=#| || bgcolor=#| || None ||  None || None ||
|-
| TD ||  || bgcolor=#| || bgcolor=#| || bgcolor=#| || None ||  None || None ||
|-
| TD ||  || bgcolor=#| || bgcolor=#| || bgcolor=#| || None ||  None || None ||
|-
| Louise (Uding) ||  || bgcolor=#| || bgcolor=#| || bgcolor=#| || Philippines, Vietnam, Laos ||  None || None ||
|-
| Marge (Wening)||  || bgcolor=#| || bgcolor=#| || bgcolor=#| || Philippines, Vietnam ||  None || None ||
|-
| TD ||  || bgcolor=#| || bgcolor=#| || bgcolor=#| || None ||  None || None ||
|-
| TD ||  || bgcolor=#| || bgcolor=#| || bgcolor=#| || None ||  None || None ||
|-
| Nora ||  || bgcolor=#| || bgcolor=#| || bgcolor=#| || Vietnam, Thailand ||  None || None ||
|-
| TD ||  || bgcolor=#| || bgcolor=#| || bgcolor=#| || None ||  None || None ||
|-
| Opal ||  || bgcolor=#| || bgcolor=#| || bgcolor=#| || Vietnam ||  None || None ||
|-
| TD ||  || bgcolor=#| || bgcolor=#| || bgcolor=#| || None ||  None || None ||
|-
| TD ||  || bgcolor=#| || bgcolor=#| || bgcolor=#| || None ||  None || None ||
|-
| Patsy (Yoling) ||  || bgcolor=#| || bgcolor=#| || bgcolor=#| || Mariana Islands, Philippines, Vietnam ||  ||  ||
|-
| Ruth (Aning) ||  || bgcolor=#| || bgcolor=#| || bgcolor=#| || None ||  None || None ||
|-
| TD ||  || bgcolor=#| || bgcolor=#| || bgcolor=#| || None ||  None || None ||
|-
| TD ||  || bgcolor=#| || bgcolor=#| || bgcolor=#| || None ||  None || None ||
|-
| Bidang ||  || bgcolor=#| || bgcolor=#| || bgcolor=#| || None ||  None || None ||
|-

See also 

 List of Pacific typhoon seasons
 1970 Pacific hurricane season
 1970 Atlantic hurricane season
 1970 North Indian Ocean cyclone season
 Australian cyclone seasons: 1969–70, 1970–71
 South Pacific cyclone seasons: 1969–70, 1970–71
 South-West Indian Ocean cyclone seasons: 1969–70, 1970–71

References

External links 
 Japan Meteorological Agency
 Joint Typhoon Warning Center .
 China Meteorological Agency
 National Weather Service Guam
 Hong Kong Observatory
 Macau Meteorological Geophysical Services
 Korea Meteorological Agency
 Philippine Atmospheric, Geophysical and Astronomical Services Administration
 Taiwan Central Weather Bureau
 Digital Typhoon - Typhoon Images and Information
 Typhoon2000 Philippine typhoon website